The ampulla of Vater, also known as the  or the hepatopancreatic duct, is formed by the union of the pancreatic duct and the common bile duct. The ampulla is specifically located at the major duodenal papilla.

The ampulla of Vater is an important landmark halfway along the second part of the duodenum that marks the anatomical transition from foregut to midgut, and hence the point where the celiac trunk stops supplying the gut and the superior mesenteric artery takes over.

Structure

The cystic duct leaves the gallbladder and joins with the common hepatic duct to form the common bile duct. This duct subsequently joins with the pancreatic duct; this junction is known as the ampulla of Vater. The pancreatic duct delivers substances such as bicarbonate and digestive enzymes to the duodenum. The bile from the gallbladder contains salts which emulsify large fat droplets into much smaller units. This provides a large surface area for the lipase enzymes to act on. The bicarbonate neutralises the acidic chyme, creating alkaline conditions for enzymes such as chymotrypsin and amylase to function optimally.

Function
Various smooth muscle sphincters regulate the flow of bile and pancreatic juice through the ampulla: the sphincter of the pancreatic duct, the sphincter of the bile duct, and the sphincter of Oddi.

The sphincter of Oddi controls the introduction of bile and pancreatic secretions into the duodenum, as well as preventing the entry of duodenal contents into the ampulla.

Clinical relevance
Pancreatitis can result from a failure of pancreatic secretions to drain properly. One possible cause of impaired drainage of pancreatic juice is blockage of the sphincter of Oddi. A common cause of blockage is a gallstone in the common bile duct.

Thomas' sign is the production of silver stools and can be indicative of cancer of the Ampulla of Vater. The silver-colored stool is a combination of the white stool of obstructive jaundice combined with black stool of melena or bleeding. It was first described in the British Medical Journal by Dr. H. Ogilvie in 1955.

Etymology
The eponymic term "ampulla of Vater" is named after Abraham Vater (1684–1751), a German anatomist who first published a description of it in 1720.

Additional images

References

 "Ampulla, hepatopancreatic." Stedman's Medical Dictionary, 27th ed. (2000). 
 Moore, Keith L. and Arthur F. Dalley. Clinically Oriented Anatomy, 4th ed. (1999). 

Pancreas anatomy
Gallbladder

pl:Brodawka Vatera